The following is a list of works, both in film and other media, for which the Japanese filmmaker Akira Kurosawa made some documented creative contribution. This includes a complete list of films with which he was involved (including the films on which he worked as assistant director before becoming a full director), as well as his little-known contributions to theater, television and literature.

Filmography

As director
All the following are Japanese productions unless otherwise specified.

A documentary film about the Noh theater, Gendai no No (Modern Noh), which was begun by the director during a break in the shooting of Ran, but was abandoned after about fifty minutes were filmed, is being completed according to Kurosawa's script and notes.

As producer
Note: Data for the remainder of this filmography is derived primarily from the complete filmography created by Kurosawa's biographer, Stuart Galbraith IV, supplemented by IMDb's Kurosawa page.

For the following films that Kurosawa directed, he also received a production credit:
 Stray Dog (associate producer)
 Throne of Blood (co-producer)
 The Lower Depths (producer)
 The Hidden Fortress (co-producer)
 The Bad Sleep Well (co-producer)
 Yojimbo (associate producer)
 Sanjuro (associate producer)
 High and Low (associate producer)
 Red Beard (associate producer)
 Dodesukaden (executive producer and producer)
 Kagemusha (producer).

In addition, Kurosawa received a production credit on one film that he himself did not direct: Haru no tawamure (1949) (Spring Flirtation), written and directed by Kajiro Yamamoto, on which he served as an associate producer.

As screenwriter
Kurosawa wrote or co-wrote the screenplays for all the films he himself directed. However, to supplement his income, he also wrote scripts for other Japanese directors throughout the 1940s, and even through the 1950s and part of the 1960s, long after he had become world-famous. He also worked on the scripts for two Hollywood productions he was slated to direct, but which, for complex reasons, were completed by and credited to other directors (although he reportedly did shoot some scenes for Tora tora tora!, the footage from which has apparently not survived). Finally, near the end of his life, he completed scripts he intended to direct but did not live to make, which were then filmed by others. A table of all these screenplays is given below; all titles are Japanese productions unless otherwise noted.

{| class="wikitable" border="1" style="font-size: 100%;"
|-
! Year !! Original Title !! English Title <br/ >(International Release Title) !! Director(s) !! Screenplay Collaborator(s)
|-
| rowspan=1 style=background:#efefef; | 1941
| Uma
| Horse
| Kajirō Yamamoto
| Kajirō Yamamoto
|- style=background:#efefef;
| rowspan=2 style=background:#efefef; | 1942
| Seishun no kiryū
| Wind Currents of Youth
| Shū Fushimizu
| None
|-
| Tsubasa no gaika
| The Triumphant Song of the Wings
| Satsuo Yamamoto
| Bonhei Sotoyama
|- style=background:#efefef;
| rowspan=1 style=background:#efefef; | 1944
| Dohyōmatsuri
| Wrestling-Ring Festival
| Santaro Marune
| None
|-
| rowspan=1 style=background:#efefef; | 1945
| Appare Isshin Tasuke
| Bravo! Tasuke Isshin
| Kiyoshi Saeki
| None
|- style=background:#efefef;
| rowspan=2 style=background:#efefef; | 1947
| Yotsu no koi no monogatari (dai ichi-wa Hatsukoi)
| Four Love Stories (segment First Love)
| Shirō Toyoda
| None
|-
| Ginrei no hate
| To the End of the Snow-Capped <br/ >Mountains <br/ >(Snow Trail)
| Senkichi Taniguchi
| Senkichi Taniguchi
|- style=background:#efefef;
| rowspan=1 style=background:#efefef; | 1948
| Shōzō
| The Portrait
| Keisuke Kinoshita
| None
|-
| rowspan=2 style=background:#efefef; | 1949
| Jigoku no kifujin
| Lady from Hell
| Motoyoshi Oda
| Motosake Nishikame
|- style=background:#efefef;
| Jyakoman to Tetsu
| Jakoman and Tetsu
| Senkichi Taniguchi
| Senkichi Taniguchi
|-
| rowspan=3 style=background:#efefef;| 1950
| Akatsuki no dassō
| Escape at Dawn
| Senkichi Taniguchi
| Senkichi Taniguchi
|- style=background:#efefef;
| Jiruba no Tetsu
| Tetsu of Jilba
| Isamu Kosugi
| Goro Tanada
|-
| Tateshi danpei
| Fencing Master
| Masahiro Makino
| None
|- style=background:#efefef;
| rowspan=2 style=background:#efefef; | 1951
| Ai to nikushimi no kanata e
| Beyond Love and Hate
| Senkichi Taniguchi
| Senkichi Taniguchi
|-
| Kedamono no yado
| The Den of Beasts
| Tatsuyasu Osone
| None
|- style=background:#efefef;
| rowspan=2 style=background:#efefef;| 1952
| Araki Mataemon: Kettô kagiya no tsuji
| Mataemon Araki – Duel at Keymakers' Corner(Vendetta for a Samurai)
| Kazuo Mori
| None
|-
| Sengoku burai
| Vagabonds in a Country at War (Sword for Hire)
| Hiroshi Inagaki
| Hiroshi Inagaki
|- style=background:#efefef;
| rowspan=1 style=background:#efefef; | 1953
| Fukeyo harukaze
| Blow! Spring Wind (My Wonderful Yellow Car)
| Senkichi Taniguchi
| Senkichi Taniguchi
|-
| rowspan=2 style=background:#efefef; | 1955
| Kieta chūtai
| Vanished Enlisted Man
| Akira Mimura
| Ryuzo Kikushima
|- style=background:#efefef;
| Asunaro monogatari
| Hiba Arborvitae Story (Tomorrow I'll Be a Fire Tree)
| Hiromichi Horikawa
| None
|-
| rowspan=1 style=background:#efefef; | 1957
| Nichiro sensō shōno hishi - Tekichū ōdan sanbyaku ri
| Three Hundred Miles Through Enemy Lines (Advance Patrol)| Kazuo Mori
| Hideo Oguni
|- style=background:#efefef;
| rowspan=1 style=background:#efefef;| 1959
| Sengoku guntō-den| The Story of Robbers of the Civil Wars (Saga of the Vagabonds)
| Toshio Sugie
| None
|-
| rowspan=1 style=background:#efefef; | 1962
| Tateshi danpei| Fencing Master| Harumi Mizuho
| None
|- style=background:#efefef;
| rowspan=1 style=background:#efefef; | 1964
| Jyakoman to Tetsu| Jakoman and Tetsu| Kinji Fukasaku
| Senkichi Taniguchi
|-
| rowspan=1 style=background:#efefef; | 1965
| Sugata Sanshirō| Sanshirō Sugata| Sei-ichirō Uchikawa
| None
|- style=background:#efefef;
| rowspan=1 style=background:#efefef; | 1970
| Tora tora tora! (USA)
| Tora! Tora! Tora!(uncredited)
| Richard Fleischer, Toshio Masuda and Kinji Fukasaku
| Japanese sequences: Hideo Oguni and Ryuzo Kikushima; American sequences: Larry Forrester
|-
| rowspan=1 style=background:#efefef; | 1985
| Runaway Train (USA)
| Runaway Train(uncredited)
| Andrei Konchalovsky
| Djordje Milicevic, Paul Zindel and Edward Bunker (based on the script by AK, Hideo Oguni and Ryuzo Kikushima)
|- style=background:#efefef;
| rowspan=2 style=background:#efefef; | 2000
| Ame Agaru| After the Rain| Takashi Koizumi
| None
|-
| Dora-heita| Alley Cat| Kon Ichikawa
| Kon Ichikawa, Keisuke Kinoshita and Masaki Kobayashi ("The Club of the Four Knights")
|- style=background:#efefef;
| rowspan=1 style=background:#efefef; | 2002
| Umi wa miteita| The Sea Was Watching (The Sea Is Watching)
| Kei Kumai
| None
|}

In addition, Kurosawa wrote the following unproduced scripts, composed during the pre-war period in the 1930s and also the wartime period in the 1940s, either when he was still an assistant director or had just graduated to full director. Some of these won prizes in screenwriting contests, establishing his reputation as a promising talent even though they were never filmed.

 Deruma-dera no doitsujin – A German at Daruma Temple Shizukanari –  All Is Quiet Yuki – Snow Mori no senichia – A Thousand and One Nights in the Forest Jajauma monogatari – The Story of a Bad Horse Dokkoi kono yari – The Lifted Spear San Paguita no hana – The San Pajuito Flower Utsukishiki koyomi – Beautiful Calendar Daisan hatoba – The Third HarborAs assistant director

As editor
Kurosawa edited all his own films, though he only occasionally took screen credit for it. There are, however, only a few instances in which he edited the work of others, as listed below.

 Horse (1941) (Uma), directed by Kajiro Yamamoto (also second unit director, co-writer (uncredited), co-director (uncredited))
 Snow Trail (1947) (Ginrei no hate), directed and co-edited by Senkichi Taniguchi (also co-writer)
 The Hiba Arborvitae Story (1955)  (Asunaro monogatari) (also co-writer), directed by Hiromichi Horikawa
 Legacy of the 500,000, AKA 500,000 (1963) (Gojuman-nin no isan) (uncredited), directed by Toshiro Mifune

Theater work
During the mid-to-late 1940s, for the first and apparently the only time in his career, Akira Kurosawa involved himself in a number of theater-related projects.

 Shaberu (Talking) – In 1945, immediately after the war, Kurosawa wrote a one-act play entitled Talking, for, in his words, "Kawaguchi's troupe" (presumably meaning playwright Matsutarō Kawaguchi, who was prominent at this time and who also worked in the film industry). The central character of the drama is a fish merchant who, during the war, greatly admires Prime Minister Tōjō. In emulation of his patriarchal hero, the merchant plays the tyrant at home, but when the war ends, his angry family members air their long pent-up grievances against him. Kurosawa called it "a comic treatment of... Japanese who all begin talking at once", because "we who had been able to express nothing of what we were thinking up to that time [the end of the war] all began talking at once."
 Yoidore Tenshi (Drunken Angel) – During the Toho strike of 1948, when Kurosawa could not work, he wrote and directed a stage adaptation of his acclaimed 1948 film (see above), with Takashi Shimura and Toshiro Mifune playing the same roles they played in the movie. The production ran for brief periods in a number of Japanese cities, apparently with great success.
 Predlozhenia (A Marriage Proposal) by Anton Chekhov – Also during the Toho strike, Kurosawa directed a production of this popular early Chekhov farce. Neither the actors who appeared in the production nor its reception by the public is known.

Television work
A documentary about horses called Song of the Horse (or Uma no Uta), directed by Kurosawa, was broadcast in Japan, supposedly on August 31, 1970 (Kurosawa otherwise totally avoided working in television). Very little is known about the film, and its release date is even in question. For instance, though the film is often said to have aired in August 1970, it is thought that the film features footage of events that did not take place until the summer of 1971. It was considered a lost film for decades and was not available on home video in any form. At some point in the 2010s, the film was rediscovered. It was remastered and released on DVD by the American independent company SamuraiDVD in 2017, complete with English subtitles.

Books
Prior to writing the screenplay to his film, Stray Dog (Nora Inu, 1949), Kurosawa created, in about six weeks, a novel based on the same story (presumably also called Stray Dog), which he never published. It was written in the style of one of his favorite writers, the French crime author Georges Simenon. Writing it was supposed to help him compose the script as quickly as possible, but he found that writing the screenplay took even longer than usual because of the complex differences between literature and film.

In 1980, inspired by the memoir of one of his heroes, Jean Renoir, he began to publish in serial form his autobiography, entitled Gama no abura (An Oily Toad). The book deals with the period from the director's birth to his winning the Golden Lion for Rashomon from the Venice Film Festival in 1951; the period from 1951 through 1980 is not covered. The title of the book is a reference to a legend according to which, if one places a deformed toad in a box full of mirrors, it will become so afraid of its own reflection that it will begin to sweat, and this sweat allegedly had medicinal properties. Kurosawa compared himself to the toad, nervous about having to contemplate, through the process of writing his life story, his own multiple "reflections." It was published as a book in Japan in 1981, and in English translation the following year under the title Something Like an Autobiography. The book's appearance coincided with the revival of interest in Kurosawa's work following the international release of Kagemusha.

In 1999, his book, Yume wa tensai de aru (A Dream Is a Genius) was published posthumously. It has not been translated into English, except for Chapter 3. This chapter consists of a selection of 100 of the director's favorite films, listed in chronological order, with detailed commentaries on each film, all given at the request of Kurosawa's daughter, Kazuko. (Since he deliberately limits himself to one film per director, however, the list emerges as more of a "favorite directors" list than a "greatest films" list.) This chapter, but not the remainder of the book, can be found in English on the Internet.Complete Drawings'' (with text in Japanese) was published by Shogakukan in 1999.

The screenplays of many of Kurosawa's films have been published in English. For further information, consult the Wikipedia articles relating to the individual films.

References
Notes

References

Sources

 
 
 
 
 
 
 

Works
Japanese filmographies
Director filmographies